The North Fork Payette River is a river in the western  United States in western Idaho. It flows about  southwards from the Salmon River Mountains to near Banks, where it empties into the Payette River, a tributary of the Snake River.

Course
It rises at the confluence of Trail Creek and Cloochman Creek, in a meadow in the Payette National Forest in Valley County. The river exits from the southwestern corner of the lake at McCall and flows southwards through Long Valley into Lake Cascade, a large reservoir formed by Cascade Dam. The Lake Fork and Gold Fork rivers join from the north and east sides of the lake.

Paralleled by State Highway 55, it crosses into Boise County, where the canyon's depth exceeds .

The North Fork joins with the Payette River at Banks. From there, the Payette River flows  further west to its confluence with the Snake River at Payette, just northeast of Ontario, Oregon.

See also

 Columbia River
 List of rivers of Idaho
 List of longest streams of Idaho

References

External links

Rivers of Idaho
Rivers of Valley County, Idaho
Rivers of Boise County, Idaho
Payette National Forest